The Minister in charge of Housing is a cabinet member in the Government of France. Since 6 July 2020, the position has been occupied by Emmanuelle Wargon, Minister Delegate attached to the Minister of the Ecological Transition.

History
In 1925 the position was created and called High Commissioner for Housing, after the war it became the Minister for Housing and Rebuilding.
In 1967 it became attached to the Minister of Public Works in the government of Georges Pompidou then attached to the Minister of Territorial Development. Since 2007 the position is attached to the Minister of Ecology.

Previous titles have been:  (Minister of Housing and Territorial Equality),  (Minister of Employment, Social Cohesion and Housing).

List of Housing Ministers since 2009

Presidency of Nicolas Sarkozy
18 May 2007 – 15 January 2009: Christine Boutin (Ministre du Logement et de la Ville)
15 January 2009 – 23 June 2009: Christine Boutin (Ministre du Logement)
23 June 2009 – 13 November 2010: Benoist Apparu (Secrétaire d'État chargé du Logement et de l'Urbanisme)
23 June 2009 – 22 February 2012: Benoist Apparu (Secrétaire d'État chargé du Logement)
22 February 2012 – 10 May 2012: Benoist Apparu (Ministre délégué au Logement)

Presidency of François Hollande
16 May 2012 – 2 April 2014: Cécile Duflot (Ministre de l'Égalité des territoires et du Logement)
2 April 2014 – 26 August 2014: Sylvia Pinel (Ministre du Logement et de l'Égalité des territoires)
26 August 2014 – 11 February 2016: Sylvia Pinel (Ministre du Logement, de l'Égalité des territoires et de la Ruralité)
6 December 2016 – 17 May 2017: Emmanuelle Cosse (Ministre du Logement et de l'Habitat durable)

Presidency of Emmanuel Macron
17 May 2017 – 21 June 2017: Richard Ferrand (Ministre de la Cohésion des territoires)
21 June 2017 – 16 October 2018: Jacques Mézard (Ministre de la Cohésion des territoires)
16 October 2018 – 6 July 2020: Julien Denormandie (Ministre chargé de la Ville et du Logement)
6 July 2020 – Present: Emmanuelle Wargon (Ministre chargé du Logement)

See also
 Public housing in France

References

Sources

Housing